Ulukhaktok (Kangiryuarmiutun (Inuit language) spelling Ulukhaqtuuq and known until 1 April 2006 as Holman or Holman Island) is a small hamlet on the west coast of Victoria Island, in the Inuvik Region of the Northwest Territories, Canada.

Like other small traditional communities in the territories, hunting, trapping, and fishing are major sources of income, but printmaking has taken over as the primary source of income in recent years. The two principal languages in Ulukhaktok are the Kangiryuarmiutun dialect of Inuinnaqtun, which is part of the Inuvialuktun group, and English.

The village has the world's most northerly golf course.

The community was covered in the Inuvialuit Final Agreement as part of their land claims and is in the Inuvialuit Settlement Region.

History

The first people to settle in the area were Natkusiak and his family in 1937. Two years later, the Hudson's Bay Company relocated from Walker Bay and a Roman Catholic mission was opened the same year.

The English name, Holman, was in honour of J.R. Holman, a member of Sir Edward Augustus Inglefield's 1853 expedition in search for the Arctic explorer, John Franklin. The community was sometimes known as Holman Island. This, however, is the name of the small island outcrop to the east-southeast in the Amundsen Gulf.

In 2006, the community was renamed, Ulukhaktok, the traditional Kangiryuarmiutun name for the area, which means "the place where ulu parts are found", or "a large bluff where we used to collect raw material to make ulus". The large bluff that overlooks Ulukhaktok was the source that provided the slate and copper used to make ulus and give the community its name. Thus, the people who live there are called Ulukhaktokmiut  ("people of"). Ulukhaktokmiut is a recent word as no people actually lived permanently in this area until the opening of the Hudson's Bay Company store, although people did visit the area to obtain the ulu materials and camp en route to other nomadic seasonal camp areas.

Inuit traded with mainland groups as far east as King William Island and as far south as Great Bear Lake although most commerce occurred with the Inuvialuit and Copper Inuit populations indigenous to the Coppermine River watershed and Bernard Harbour seasonal areas on the mainland. The majority of Ulukhaktokmiut come from a varied background, with family ties extending mainly to the Coppermine River community of Kugluktuk, Nunavut and the communities of the Mackenzie River Delta and Beaufort Sea, though some families have relatives as far away as Gjoa Haven on King William Island, and along the north slope of Alaska as far as Port Clarence on the Seward Peninsula.

Some families are descendants of the Danish explorer-trader Christian Klengenberg. Others are descended from two members of the Vilhjalmur Stefansson-led Canadian Arctic Expedition. The first was Natkusiak, a friend of Stefansson, and the primary guide and lead hunter of the expedition. Originally from Port Clarence, Alaska he was later known as Billy Banksland, this name coming from his time trapping Arctic foxes on Banks Island. Another member of the expedition with relatives in the area was the Alaskan Iñupiat, Ikey Bolt from Point Hope. Married to Klengenberg's daughter Etna, they lived for several years at Rymer Point before moving to Minto Inlet and eventually to Coppermine (now Kugluktuk).

Demographics

In 2016, 370 (96.4%) of its residents were Inuvialuit or Inuit and the rest (6.6%) were non-Indigenous. The main languages in the community are Inuinnaqtun (Inuvialuktun) and English

Economy
The hamlet has seen both sides of the rush for mineral exploration and has regained an appreciation for its wild places and culturally sensitive areas where long-gone relatives once survived and lived with the ice and snow. Some private concerns have witnessed the zeal with which these locals defend their competing interests for the same tracts of land and resources. Other companies have learned to work with residents and this has produced some hope for mineral development around traditional lands and other cultural areas of these Inuvialuit and their fellow Inuit brethren. Arts and crafts are also another source of income with international recognition of local artisans. Occasionally some residents travel to such places as San Francisco, California or Melbourne, Australia, but more often to other regional centres across the north.

Ulukhaktok is home to the Holman Eskimo Co-op founded in 1961 by the residents of the community with the help of Roman Catholic priest, Father Henri Tardy. The Co-op was formed to provide income to the residents of the community by producing arts and crafts, and is famous for the production of prints. Formally Holman Prints, artists in the community sell their art though the Ulukhaktok Arts Centre. Famous artists who have produced prints for the Holman Eskimo Co-op include Mary K. Okheena and Helen Kalvak. The local school, Helen Kalvak Elihakvik is named after her.

In the 1960s and 1970s Holman Eskimo Co-operative also created a number of sealskin products for southern markets, including parkas, tapestries and stuffed animals. The sealskin parkas were made to last and still show up on the market. The Prince of Wales Northern Heritage Centre in Yellowknife also has a parka in their collection.

In 2001 the Winnipeg Art Gallery curated an exhibition "Holman: Forty Years of Graphic Art/Quarante Ans D'Art Graphique " which produced a exhibition catalogue authored by Winnipeg Art Gallery Curator Darlene Coward Wight.

The Holman Eskimo Co-op is now involved in arts and crafts, retailing, the hotel business, and cable television. It operates both a Canada Post outlet, and the fuel delivery contract, and is the local Aklak Air agent.

Ulukhaktok is also the location of the world's most northern golf course and hosts the "Billy Joss Open Celebrity Golf Tournament" every summer. Over the years they have managed to attract players from the Edmonton Oilers and the Edmonton Eskimos, as well as golfers from other countries. This tournament is growing and features excursions to traditional areas where Arctic char and Northern Lake trout are harvested for subsistence as well as limited commercial fishing and hunting.

Climate
Ulukhaktok has a tundra climate (ET) with short but cool summers and long cold winters.

Notable people 

 Mary K. Okheena (born 1957), graphic artist

See also 
 Legislative Assembly of the Northwest Territories
 List of municipalities in the Northwest Territories
 Ulukhaktok/Holman Airport

References 
 Richard G. Condon, Julia Ogina and the Holman Elders, The Northern Copper Inuit

External links 

Communities in the Inuvik Region
Hamlets in the Northwest Territories
Inuit in the Northwest Territories
Inuvialuit communities
Road-inaccessible communities of the Northwest Territories
Victoria Island (Canada)
Populated places in Arctic Canada